The 2017 Settimana Internazionale di Coppi e Bartali was a road cycling stage race that took place between 23 and 26 March 2017. The race was rated as a 2.1 event as part of the 2018 UCI Europe Tour, and was the 32nd edition of the Settimana Internazionale di Coppi e Bartali cycling race.

Teams
Twenty-five teams started the race. Each team had a maximum of eight riders:

Route

Stages

Stage 1a

Stage 1b
For the time trial, each team was split into two four-man teams.

Stage 2

Stage 3

Stage 4

Final general classification

References

Settimana Internazionale di Coppi e Bartali
Settimana Internazionale di Coppi e Bartali
2018